Liocanthydrus armulatus is a species of water beetle first found in the Neotropical realm.

References

Further reading
GUIMARÃES, BRUNO AGUILAR CARRILHO, and N. E. L. S. O. N. FERREIRA-JR. "Two new species and new records of Liocanthydrus Guignot (Coleoptera, Noteridae) from Brazil." Zootaxa 3914.5 (2003): 591–596.

Noteridae
Beetles described in 2014